The highest-selling albums and mini-albums in Japan are ranked in the Oricon Weekly Chart, published by Oricon Style magazine. The data is compiled by Oricon based on each album's weekly physical sales. In 2009, 46 albums reached the peak of the charts.

Rock group Unicorn released their comeback album, Chambre, which debuted atop the charts making them the second group after Kaguyahime in 1978 to achieve this feat. Pop group Dreams Come True set the record for most number-one albums by a female vocal group; with their fifteenth studio album, Do You Dreams Come True? [sic], giving them their twelfth number-one album putting them ahead of the late Zard. With the release of her tenth studio album, Next Level, pop artist Ayumi Hamasaki became the first artist to have at least one number-one album for 11 consecutive years since her debut. Ultimate Diamond made pop-rock singer Nana Mizuki the first voice actress to have a number-one album.

The best-selling album overall of 2009 was pop boy band Arashi's greatest-hits album All the Best! 1999–2009, released on August 19, 2009, with the sales of over 1,432,000 copies. The second-best-selling album was pop rock band Mr. Children's studio album Supermarket Fantasy. Supermarket Fantasy was released on December 10, 2008 and sold over 1,251,000 copies. The third-best-selling album was pop vocal group Greeeen's studio album Shio, Koshō, released on June 10, 2009, with the sales of over 1,000,000 copies. The fourth- and fifth-best-selling albums were R&B group Exile's studio album Aisubeki Mirai e and their 2008 compilation album Exile Ballad Best. Aisubeki Mirai e sold over 897,000 copies and Exile Ballad Best sold over 847,000 copies on the yearly charts.

Chart history

Footnotes

References

See also
2009 in music

Japan Albums
2009
Number-one albums